The first-seeds Jack Crawford and Harry Hopman successfully defended their title by defeating Tim Fitchett and Jack Hawkes 8–6, 6–1, 2–6, 6–3 in the final, to win the men's doubles tennis title at the 1930 Australian Championships.

Seeds

  Jack Crawford /  Harry Hopman (champions)
 ( Tim Fitchett /  Jack Hawkes) (final)
  Ray Dunlop /  Jim Willard (semifinals)
  Jack Cummings /  Gar Moon (semifinals)

Draw

Draw

Eliminating round

In order to eliminate byes the council of L.T.A.A. decided that in case of events for which there were more than the number of entries acceptable, a preliminary elimination tournament should be played.

Eliminating matches were played on Saturday, 18 January:

 Ron Ford /  Bill Halliday d.  J. S. D. Sweeting /  Norman Mussen 7–5, 6–3, 6–2
 Max Carpenter /  Bill Simpson d.  Alfred Chave /  John Grinstead  7–5, 7–5, 7–5
 Gemmell Payne /  George Thomas d.  Keith Dalgleish /  Angus Smith 4–6, 6–3, 9–11, 6–4, 6–3
 Vic Beament /  Gerald Gaffy d.  Allan Knight /  Adrian Quist 6–2, 6–1, 6–4
 Dave Thompson /  Bruce Walker d.  Charles Buckley /  Thomas Robinson 6–0, 8–6, 6–1
 Max Noble /  Tom Trigg d.  Cec Cranfield /  Harold Doctor 2–6, 7–5, 6–4, 4–6, 6–4

Notes

References

External links
Source for seedings

1930 in Australian tennis
Men's Doubles